The House of Petrović-Njegoš (Serbian Cyrillic: ,   / ) is the Serbian family that ruled Montenegro from 1697 to 1916.

Montenegro was ruled from its inception by vladikas (prince-bishops) since 1516, who had a dual temporal and spiritual role. In 1697, the office was made hereditary in the Petrović-Njegoš family. However, since Orthodox bishops are required to be celibate, the crown passed from uncle to nephew. In 1852, Prince-Bishop Danilo II opted to marry and to secularize Montenegro, becoming Prince Danilo I. His successor, Nikola I, raised Montenegro to a kingdom in 1910. In 1916, King Nikola I was ousted by the invasion and occupation of his country by Austria-Hungary. He was formally deposed by the Podgorica Assembly in 1918 and the country merged with Kingdom of Serbia and shortly thereafter merged again with the State of Slovenes, Croats and Serbs to form the Kingdom of Serbs, Croats and Slovenes.

A period of eighty years of control from Belgrade followed, during which time Nikola I died in exile in France in 1921, followed shortly afterwards by the surprise abdication of his son and heir, Danilo III, the same year. The latter's nephew, Michael Petrović-Njegoš, inherited the titles of his predecessors whilst in exile in France, and he survived arrest and internment by order of Adolf Hitler for refusing to head up a puppet Montenegrin state aligned to the Axis Powers. Later, he served the SFR Yugoslavia as Head of Protocol. He was succeeded by his son Nicholas Petrović-Njegoš in 1986. Nicholas returned to Montenegro to support the Montenegrin independence movement that went on to achieve full sovereignty in the 2006 referendum.

In 2011, Montenegro recognized an official role for the Royal House of Petrović-Njegoš in Montenegro: to promote Montenegrin identity, culture and traditions through cultural, humanitarian and other non-political activities, which has been interpreted as a "creeping restoration" of the monarchy.

The present head of the house is Nicholas, Crown Prince of Montenegro.

History

Origin
"Bogut" or "Boguta" is believed to be the oldest known ancestor of the Petrović-Njegoš family. Bogut was alive at the time of the Battle of Velbazhd (1330) and the building of Visoki Dečani, and perhaps into the 1340s. According to tradition, and recorded by some historians, the ancestors of the Petrović family settled in Muževice at the end of the 14th century, from the Bosnia region, from the area of Zenica or Travnik. It is possible that Bogut at that time had moved to Drobnjaci with his son, Đurađ.  Đurađ or some of his sons were in the entourage of Marko Drago, an affluent Serbian nobleman who had served Serbian lord Vuk Branković (1345-1397), and as such they are believed to have also served the Branković family. Đurađ and his five sons "from Drobnjaci" are mentioned in a document dating March 1, 1399, in which they gave several items to the depository of Dapko Vasilijev, an affluent Kotoran nobleman.

Modern role
On the 12 July 2011 the Parliament of Montenegro adopted the Law on the Status of the Descendants of the Petrović Njegoš Dynasty.

The law "regulates the important issues regarding the status of the descendants of the Petrović-Njegoš dynasty, for the historical and moral rehabilitation of the Petrović-Njegoš dynasty for whom their dethroning was contrary to the Constitution of the Kingdom of Montenegro, a violent act of annexation in the year 1918." (Article 1).

The law recognises the descendants of King Nikola I in the male line and their wives as the descendants of the Petrović-Njegoš dynasty (Article 2), and appoints the eldest male heir, namely Prince Nikola II, as the representative of the dynasty (Article 5). It also affirms the House law of the dynasty by defining the succession to the headship of the dynasty as being passed down through the "male heir of the oldest male heir" (Article 5).

The law protects the use of the heraldic symbols of the dynasty by the representative of the dynasty, Prince Nikola II (Article 6).

Article 8 allows for members of the dynasty to obtain Montenegrin citizenship and also to be dual-nationals of other nations without losing their Montenegrin citizenship. This is of particular relevance today as all of the members of the dynasty also hold French citizenship.

The law also creates the non-political (Article 10) Petrović-Njegoš Foundation (Article 9), an organisation chaired by Prince Nikola II (Article 10), with its aim to "affirm the Montenegrin culture and participation in humanitarian and development activities in the interest of Montenegro and its traditions" (Article 9).

From Montenegro's exchequer, the law allocates 4.3 million euros over a seven-year period to the Petrović-Njegoš Foundation (Article 11). In addition, Prince Nikola II is entitled to a monthly income equivalent to the gross monthly earnings of the President of Montenegro (Article 16).

The Petrovic-Njegoš Foundation has its seat in Montenegro. "The Descendants of the dynasty are given the continuous use of the house of King Nikola I of Montenegro in Njeguši...its gardens...and meadow-land."

"Descendants of the dynasty will have built for them a family home in Cetinje...and be given an apartment in Podgorica" (Article 12).

To carry out their official functions Prince Nikola II has the right to use State objects and resources and "the exclusive right of use of the first storey" of the Petrović Palace (Dvorac Petrovića) in Podgorica, "and when protocol requires, use of the ground floor with priority over other users" (Article 13).

The law allows for Prince Nikola II to act as a representative of the Government of Montenegro and perform other protocolar and non-political functions (Article 7). The first such undertaking was made by the Prince in July 2011 when he represented the Prime Minister of Montenegro, Igor Lukšić, at the requiem of Otto von Habsburg, former Crown Prince of Austria-Hungary.

When performing functions on behalf of the Government, Prince Nikola II and the other members of the dynasty are afforded full State protocol (Article 15).

Heads of the House of Petrović-Njegoš (1696–present)

Prince-Bishops of Montenegro (1697–1852)

Princes of Montenegro (1852–1910)

King of Montenegro (1910–1918)

Heads of the house since 1918
Nikola I Petrović-Njegoš (26 November 1918 – 1 March 1921)
Danilo Petrović-Njegoš (1 March 1921 – 7 March 1921)
Mihajlo Petrović-Njegoš (7 March 1921 – 24 March 1986)
Nikola Petrović-Njegoš (24 March 1986 – present) 
Boris, Hereditary Prince of Montenegro (born 1980), the Grand Voivode of Grahovo and Zeta

Male descendants of Nicholas I
The list below includes male members of the Petrović-Njegoš dynasty. Bold denotes the current head of the House.

 Nicholas I of Montenegro (1841–1921)
 Danilo, Crown Prince of Montenegro (1872–1939)
Prince Mirko (1879–1918)
Prince Stephan (1903–1908)
Prince Stanislaw (1905–1908)
 Prince Michael (1908–1986)
 Nicholas, Crown Prince of Montenegro (born 1944) 
Boris, Hereditary Prince of Montenegro (born 1980)
Prince Paul (1910–1933)
Prince Emmanuel (1912–1928).
Prince Peter (1889–1932)

See also
 The Petrović-Njegoš family tree

References

Nikola and Milena, King and Queen of the Black Mountain, The Rise and Fall of Montenegro's Royal Family by Marco Houston

External links 

 The Njegoskij Fund Public Project Private family archives-based digital documentary fund, focused on history and culture of Royal Montenegro
 Official website of the Royal House of Montenegro

 
Montenegrin nobility
Principality of Montenegro
Kingdom of Montenegro
Montenegrin royalty